The conquest of Tunis occurred on 16 August 1534 when Hayreddin Barbarossa captured the city from the Hafsid ruler Muley Hasan.

In 1533, Suleiman the Magnificent ordered Hayreddin Barbarossa, whom he had summoned from Algiers, to build a large war fleet in the arsenal of Constantinople. Altogether 70 galleys were built during the winter of 1533–34, manned by slave oarsmen, including 1,200 Christian ones. With this fleet, Barbarossa conducted aggressive raids along the coast of Italy, until he landed in Tunis on 16 August 1534, ousting the local ruler, theretofore subservient to the Spanish, the Hafsid Regent Muley Hasan.

Barbarossa thus established a strong naval base in Tunis, which could be used for raids in the region, and on nearby Malta. Tunis was a highly strategic location, controlling the passage from the west to the eastern basin of the Mediterranean.

In 1535 however, upon the plea of Muley Hasan, Emperor Charles V mounted a counter-offensive and retook the city in the conquest of Tunis of 1535.

Notes

References 
 Roger Crowley, Empire of the sea, 2008 Faber & Faber 
 Garnier, Edith L'Alliance Impie Editions du Felin, 2008, Paris  Interview

Tunis
Tunis (1534)
Tunis (1534)

16th century in Tunisia
Military history of Tunisia
History of Tunis
Suleiman the Magnificent
1534 in the Ottoman Empire
1534 in Africa
Tunis